Vladimir Georgiev Shkodrov (Владимир Георгиев Шкодров; 10 February 1930 – 31 August 2010) was a Bulgarian astronomer and professor at the Bulgarian Academy of Sciences. He is one of the founders of the Bulgarian National Observatory in Rozhen and authored numerous scientific and popular articles and books on planetary physics and astronomy.

Shkodrov discovered seven asteroids, including the near-Earth object 4486 Mithra, which he and Eric Elst discovered on 22 September 1987. Mithra is notable as the most highly bifurcated object in the Solar System. 

Besides his rich scientific career, Vladimir Shkodrov was involved in education and in politics. He was the dean of the University of Shumen and a deputy in the 37th National Assembly of Republic of Bulgaria.

List of discovered minor planets

Dissertation 

Shkodrov, Vladimir (1975) Issledovanie pogreshnosti gravimetricheskih metodov opredelenia vneshnego potenciala planeti (Analysis of the errors of the gravimetric methods in defining the external planet potential). Defended in Leningrad/Moscow's State Institute for Astronomy.

Honors 

The main-belt asteroid 4364 Shkodrov, discovered by Eleanor Helin and Schelte Bus on 7 November 1978, is named in his honor. The official naming citation was published by the Minor Planet Center on 25 August 1991.

See also

Publications

Monographs 
 Shkodrov, Vladimir (1973) Malki planeti v slunchevata sistema (Small planets in the Solar system). Sofia: Nauka i izkustvo
 Shkodrov, Vladimir (1989) Planeten potencial (Planetary Potential). Sofia: Bulgarian Academy of Sciences.
 Shkodrov, Vladimir (2005) Planetarna fizika (Planetary physics). Shumen: Shumen University Press.
 Shkodrov, Vladimir (2010) Etudi po istoria na astronomiata (Essays on History of Astronomy). Sofia: Prof. Marin Drinov

Other publications 
 Shkodrov, V. & V. Ivanova, V. Umlenski, E. Dikova (1985) Haleevata kometa na put kum sluntseto (The comet of Halley on its way to the Sun). Sofia: Narodna prosveta.

References

External links 
 Homepage, archived 
 4486 Mithra at hohmanntransfer.com

1930 births
2010 deaths
20th-century astronomers
Bulgarian astronomers
Discoverers of asteroids

Disease-related deaths in Bulgaria
People from Lom, Bulgaria